The II UNTAET Transitional Government was the second administration or cabinet of United Nations Administered East Timor, a United Nationsprotectorate that provided an interim civil administration and a peacekeeping mission in the territory of East Timor from 25 October 1999 until 20 May 2002.

On 19 September 2001, the UN Transitional Administrator, Sérgio Vieira de Mello, made a regulation on the establishment of the II UNTAET Transitional Government, which the regulation referred to officially as the "Council of Ministers".

The following day, 20 September 2001, the Transitional Administrator swore in the members of the II UNTAET Transitional Government, which was led by Chief Minister Mari Alkatiri, and was replaced on 20 May 2002 by the I Constitutional Government of the independent East Timor.

Composition
The government was made up of the following Ministers, Vice Ministers and Secretaries of State, and others, as follows:

Ministers

Vice Ministers

Secretaries of State

Others

References

Cabinets established in 2001
Cabinets disestablished in 2001
Government of East Timor
2001 establishments in East Timor
2002 disestablishments in East Timor